Moody Memorial Library is one of the two central libraries at Baylor University located in Waco, Texas. Jesse H. Jones Library is connected to Moody by two hallways and serves as the second of the two central libraries at Baylor. Moody is the larger of the two central libraries.

References

Baylor University
Libraries in Waco, Texas